"Wasting All These Tears" is a song recorded by American country music singer Cassadee Pope, written by Caitlyn Smith and Rollie Gaalswyk. It was released as Pope's debut solo single from her debut solo studio album Frame by Frame on May 31, 2013. It is the first song by Pope to reach Gold status, and has since been certified Platinum as of March 5, 2014.

Reception

Critical reception
The song received mixed to favorable reviews from music critics. Billy Dukes of Taste of Country gave the single 3 stars out of 5, saying that "While enjoyable, ‘Wasting All These Tears’ exemplifies the difference between a pop-country song and a country song performed by a pop singer." Giving it 3.5 stars out of 5, Matt Bjorke of Roughstock said that "While "Wasting All These Tears" is clearly a modern Country/Pop song, there's nothing here that says that it couldn't crossover into the pop realm, something Pope and her label likely had in their minds all along. Still, despite the crossover nature of the track, Pope delivers a strong sense of attitude and connects with the lyrics and that's more than enough to suggest the birth of a potential star." It received a "B" from Jon Freeman of Country Weekly, who praised Pope's voice and said that the arrangement was "Avril Lavigne plus banjo". He thought that the song would have the potential to make Pope a breakout on The Voice. Newsday's Glenn Gamboa was also critical commenting that "Cassadee may want to claim a country base, but her vocals are still closer to Avril Lavigne than Carrie Underwood" and that "songs like "Wasting All These Tears" feel hollow and misplaced". Ben Foster of Country Universe wrote of the song, "The didactic, heavy-handed treatment all but kills off whatever potency the song might otherwise have carried" and gave the song a C−.

Chart performance
"Wasting All These Tears" debuted at number 54 on the U.S. Billboard Country Airplay chart for the week of June 22, 2013. It also debuted at number 7 on the U.S. Billboard Hot Country Songs chart for the week of June 22, 2013. It also debuted at number 37 on the U.S. Billboard Hot 100 chart for the week of June 22, 2013. It also debuted at number 41 on the Canadian Hot 100 chart for the week of June 22, 2013. In its first week, "Wasting All These Tears" sold 125,000 copies. According to roughstock, the single has sold 1,013,000 copies as of 2 April 2014.

Music video
The music video was directed by Brian Lazzaro and premiered on CMT on July 17, 2013.

Track listing
Digital download
"Wasting All These Tears" – 3:35

Chart performance

Year-end charts

Certifications

Awards and nominations

Release history

References

2013 debut singles
2013 songs
Cassadee Pope songs
Songs written by Caitlyn Smith
Song recordings produced by Dann Huff
Republic Nashville singles
Republic Records singles
Country ballads
Pop ballads